Anchicyclocheilus halfibindus is a species of cyprinid fish endemic to China. It is the only recognized species in its genus, although some authorities treat it as a synonym of Sinocyclocheilus microphthalmus.

References

Cyprinid fish of Asia
Freshwater fish of China
Endemic fauna of China
Fish described in 1992
Barbinae